The Asian Forum for Human Rights and Development (FORUM-ASIA) [previously known as Forum-Asia] is a membership-based regional human rights organisation with 85 member organisations in 23 countries across Asia. It is committed to the promotion and protection of all human rights including the right to development.

FORUM-ASIA was founded in 1991 in Manila, The Philippines and opened its Regional Secretariat in Bangkok in 1992. Subsequently, offices have also been opened in Geneva, Jakarta and Kathmandu. It has consultative status with the United Nations Economic and Social Council since 2004.

FORUM-ASIA is committed to building a peaceful, just, equitable and ecologically sustainable community of peoples and societies in Asia, where all human rights of all individuals, groups and peoples – in particular, the poor, marginalised and discriminated against – are fully respected and realised in accordance with internationally accepted human rights norms and standards.

History

Founding (1991–1994)
In December 1991, a regional consultation, 'On Collaboration between Human Rights Organisations in South and South-East Asia', was held in Manila, the Philippines. During the meeting a new network was established, the Asian Forum for Human Rights and Development (Forum-Asia).

The idea for the consultation came from D.J. Ravindran, former Legal Officer for Asia for the International Commission of Jurists (ICJ). Prior to the consultation he had visited several countries in the region to gain input for a working paper to be used during the event.

This first consultation had participants from nine countries representing 19 organisations, who became the founding members of Forum-Asia. These organisations were:
 Ain O Salish Kendra (ASK) from Bangladesh
 Legal Resource for Social Action (LRSA) from India
 Indonesia Legal Aid Foundation (YLBHI) from Indonesia
 Suara Rakyat Malaysia (SUARAM) from Malaysia
 Informal Sector Service Centre (INSEC) from Nepal
 Human Rights Commission of Pakistan (HRCP) from Pakistan
 Task Force Detainees of the Philippines (TFDP) from the Philippines
 Philippine Alliance of Human Rights Advocates (PAHRA) from the Philippines
 Protestant Lawyers League of the Philippines (PLLP) from the Philippines
 Pilipina Legal Resources Center (PLRC) from the Philippines
 Paglilingkod Batas Pangkapapatiran Foundation (PBPF) from the Philippines
 Tanggol-Kalikasan (TK) from the Philippines
 Paralegal Training and Service Center (PTSC) from the Philippines
 Movement for Inter-Racial Justice and Equality (MIRJE) from Sri Lanka
 Law and Society Trust (LST) from Sri Lanka
 Information Human Rights Documentation Centre (INFORM) from Sri Lanka
 Union for Civil Liberty (UCL) from Thailand
 Coordination Group for Religion in Society (CGRS) from Thailand
 Friends of Women Foundation (FWF) from Thailand.
The initial objectives of Forum-Asia were to conduct programmes to further strengthen the effectiveness of human rights organisations in the region and to facilitate collaboration between them. The idea was that while there was an increase in organisations working in Asia on human rights, these organisations were mostly set up or run by groups in Europe or North America. The notion was that the region needed a regional network that was set up by Asians for Asians. Forum-Asia would provide a voice for victims of human rights abuses, their families and those that were attempting to defend them, the human right defenders (HRDs) themselves.

There was a conscious choice to include both human rights and development in the name. While most, if not all, organisations initially involved were human rights organisations, there was a recognition of the interconnectedness of the human rights concerns that many of the founding members worked on with socio-economic development, including developmental and economic inequality, and market globalisation. Throughout Forum-Asia's history so far though – that is until 2016 – the development part of its name has been overshadowed by the work on human rights.

The first months after the founding meeting were spent drafting proposals and raising funds. D.J. Ravindran was asked to help develop and establish the organisation as a consultant, and was joined in this task by Chalida Tajaroensuk. During the 1991 meeting it had been suggested that Forum-Asia should be hosted by one of the founding organisations. The UCL, based in Bangkok, Thailand became the host to the regional secretariat of the network. Ms. Songphorn Tajaroensuk became the first Secretary General of Forum-Asia.

The first activity that Forum-Asia undertook was organised jointly with TFDP and PTSC. It was a ‘Regional Training Programme on Fact-Finding and Documentation of Human Rights Violations', which took place on 27 September-12 October 1992 in Manila. It was an indication of the initial focus of the network. During the first years the activities and campaigns of Forum-Asia largely centred on capacity building with the vision of strengthening the member organisations in the region. Building on the experience of some of the members, these skills were shared and spread throughout the network.

In 1993, Forum-Asia became involved in the UN World Conference on Human Rights, including in the preparatory process that resulted in the ‘Final Declaration of the Regional Meeting for Asia of the World Conference on Human Rights or Bangkok Declaration'. This was the start of the advocacy component of Forum-Asia's work. Something which would become a central part of its strategies in the following years.

On 14–17 October 1994, the first General Assembly (GA) of Forum-Asia was held at the Wangree Resort in Nakorn Nayok, Thailand. The first three years had been labelled to be an experimental period from the start, so the GA focussed primarily on reviewing this period and making decisions for the future. During the meeting it was agreed that Forum-Asia had a distinct character and role to play and should therefore be continued and expanded.

Given its status as being in an experimental phase, no full-fledged Secretariat had been set up in the first years. During the 1994 GA it was decided that such a full-fledged Secretariat should be established, yet remain an unregistered association that would not seek judicial status. As such, it was decided that UCL would continue to host the Secretariat.

Consolidation and growth (1994–2004)

With Forum-Asia no longer being in the experimental phase, the time to strengthen and expand the network started after the GA of 1994. New strategies and programmes were developed, including diplomacy, human rights education, advocacy and campaigning. The Secretariat also expanded its work on particular focus areas, including from 1995 on women's human rights.

In 1995 Forum-Asia undertook its first country mission. The regional mission to Burma focused on assessing the situation in the country. The group met with different stakeholders, including Aung San Suu Kyi, and based on these engagements assessed how Forum-Asia could assist the HRDs of the country to improve the human rights situation in Burma.

A year later, in 1996, the involvement of Forum-Asia in Burma became instrumental to the establishment of the Alternative ASEAN Network on Burma (ALTSEAN-Burma), a network of organisations and individuals based in Member States of the Association of Southeast Asian Nations (ASEAN) that support the movement for human rights and democracy in Burma.

Forum-Asia's involvement in the developmental stage of new initiatives has been repeated multiple times during the network's existence. Forum-Asia would be part of identifying a key concern or issue related to human rights, it would (co-)organise a meeting on the topic, during which a new network or collective would be established. Often, Forum-Asia would initially fulfil the role of Secretariat or host the Secretariat for the new group before they became independent.

In this manner the Asian Network for Free Elections (ANFREL) was established in 1997. ANFREL works to promote and support democratisation at national and regional levels across Asia. They focus on elections and election monitoring. Another example is Forum-Asia's involvement with the non-governmental organisations (NGO) Coalition for the International Criminal Court (CICC) in 2001.

With time, the particular organisational priorities of Forum-Asia changed. In a report from 1999 the network describes itself by stating that '... It strives to promote, on the basis of global perspective, a regional initiative towards the protection of human rights, development and peace in the region through collaboration of human rights and development NGOs and people's organizations in Asia.

Testimony to this growing focus on global advocacy, was the granting of consultative status to Forum-Asia in 2004 to the United Nations Economic and Social Council (ECOSOC status) after a two-year application process. ECOSOC status provided Forum-Asia with access to ECOSOC, its many subsidiary bodies, the various human rights mechanisms of the United Nations (UN), ad-hoc processes on small arms, and special events organised by the President of the General Assembly. To be able to obtain ECOSOC status, the Forum-Asia Foundation was officially registered in 2000.

However, developing, expanding and strengthening a network is not easy. Known challenges that civil society organisations (CSOs) face across the globe, are multi-layered by additional complications when working through a regional network.

Reflections from 2002 highlight the emergence of Forum-Asia [as] a regional entity recognized by governments, intergovernmental organizations and civil society groups in the region and elsewhere. It has emerged as a major partner in most leading human rights activities. However, at the same time it was also said that 'We are still faced with the challenge of linking human rights activism from local, national, regional and global level. ... we have to acknowledge that not all members are equally engaged in all the campaigns and activities conducted by Forum-Asia.

While by no means unique to a network organisation, Forum-Asia decided to address these issues and those raised in a previous evaluation. In 2003 it established a project on 'Transforming the Secretariat'. An external consultant, Deep Rai, was tasked to address the challenges and needs identified by staff and the executive committee.

Independence (2005–2013)

Initiated by the aforementioned evaluation and the project, 'Transforming the Secretariat', a process was set in motion to change Forum-Asia. At the GA of 2004 it was decided that a new function would be established, being that of an executive director. In January 2005, Anselmo Lee was the first to take this position. The position of executive director of Forum-Asia would later be held by Yap Swee Seng, Giyoun Kim (Acting), and Evelyn Balais-Serrano.

The restructuring process also led to the decision to establish the network as an independent body. A change that was not to the agreement of all. Forum-Asia set up its own office, and went through the difficult process of re-establishing itself. With this came an adjustment in the name, from Forum-Asia to FORUM-ASIA. It was a difficult period in the history of the organisation and network, but one that was necessary in its evolution.

The changes prompted FORUM-ASIA to re-evaluate its strategies and programmes. By 2005 the network consisted of 36 members in 14 countries. The refocusing of its strategic priorities led to a stronger focus on international advocacy and coalition building.

A highlight of which was the establishment of the Geneva Office in 2006. The objective of the Geneva Office was and continues to be two-fold. First is to increase the impact and effectiveness of FORUM-ASIA and its members' advocacy in UN fora. Second is to encourage accountability of Asian member states to UN Human Rights Mechanisms.

In 2010 the Geneva example paved the way for the establishment of an office in Jakarta. The objective was and still is to monitor, engage with and inform FORUM-ASIA members about the developments of ASEAN, in particularly those related to the ASEAN Intergovernmental Commission on Human Rights (AICHR) and the ASEAN Commission on the Promotion and Protection of the Rights of Women and Children (ACWC). The office is hosted by the Komisi untuk Orang Hilang dan Korban Tindak Kekerasan (KontraS or Commission for the Disappeared and Victims of Violence), a prominent member organisation of FORUM-ASIA in Indonesia.

In 2006, FORUM-ASIA was involved in two notable other initiatives. The establishment of the Solidarity for Asian People's Advocacy (SAPA) – a network focussed on cross-sectoral partnerships build around shared advocacy targets – and the creation of the Asian NGO Network on National Human Rights Institutions (ANNI).

An external evaluation from 2007 concluded that '... the principal added value [of FORUM-ASIA] is a) protection ... b) facilitating regional and international human rights advocacy, and c) providing a platform for learning and collective action ... .' This observation indicated another shift in FORUM-ASIA's efforts away from the focus on capacity building from the initial years of FORUM- ASIA.

Furthering the tradition of involvement in the birth of new networks and coalitions, FORUM-ASIA was part of the establishment of the Asia Pacific Refugees Rights Network (APRRN) in 2008. FORUM-ASIA hosted APRRNs first coordinator after his appointment in 2010, and hosted the network during its formative years to allow it to grow. APRRN became independent in 2012.

One of FORUM-ASIA's latest initiatives, in this tradition, was the Regional Initiative for a South Asia Human Right Mechanism (RISAHRM). RISAHRM's aim is to establish a South Asian human rights mechanism that brings together national processes and regional aspirations.

2013–2016

In 2013 a new management team was appointed, led by Evelyn Balais-Serrano as executive director, to guide FORUM-ASIA into a new period. With the 25 year anniversary in 2016 coming up the network and organisation once again needed to reflect and re-evaluate the role, the added value and the priorities of the movement.

In recognition of the desire of many to make capacity building and training once again a central component of FORUM-ASIA's work, in 2013 it initiated the Glo-cal Advocacy Leadership in Asia Academy (GALA Academy) together with the Asian Development Alliance (ADA) and the Asian Democracy Network (ADN). The aim of the GALA Academy is to strengthen the international advocacy capacity of mid- and high-level staff in civil society organisations (CSOs).

Realising the need to enhance FORUM-ASIA's advocacy efforts in South Asia, the Kathmandu office, in Nepal was established in 2015. Hosted by founding member, INSEC, the Kathmandu office provides a permanent presence to strengthen and consolidate the human rights movement through effective collaboration with member and partner organisations in South Asia.

Member organizations 

Afghanistan
 One organisation name withheld for security reasons
 SRMO – Safety and Risk Mitigation Organization
Bangladesh
 ASK – Ain O Salish Kendra (Law and Mediation Center)
 MLAA – Madaripur Legal Aid Association
 Odhikar
 RIC – Resource Integration Center
 RMMRU – Refugee and Migratory Movements Research Unit
Burma
 Equality Myanmar
 WLB – Women's League of Burma
 Progressive Voice

Cambodia
 ADHOC – Cambodian Human Rights and Development Association
 LICADHO – Cambodia League for the Promotion and Defense of Human Rights
 WIC – Worker's Information Cente
India
 SICHREM – South India Cell for Human Rights Education and Monitoring
 PW – People's Watch
 MASUM – Banglar Manabadhikar Suraksha Mancha
 Dalit Foundation
 HRA – Human Rights Alert
 APDP – Association of Parents of Disappeared Persons
 CSNR – Centre for the Sustainable Use of Natural and Social Resources 
 CCDS – Centre for Communication and Development Studies
 Quill Foundation 
 READ – Rights Education And Development Centre
 Jananeethi
Indonesia
 AJI – The Alliance of Independent Journalists Indonesia
 HRWG – Indonesia's NGO Coalition for International Human Rights Advocacy – Human Rights Working Group
 IMPARSIAL – Inisiatif Masyarakat Partisipatif untuk Transisi Berkeadilan
 KontraS – The Federation of Commission for the Disappeared and Victims of Violence
 PBHI – Indonesian Legal Aid and Human Rights Association
 SAMIN – Yayasan Sekretariat Anak Merdeka Indonesia
 YLBHI – Indonesia Legal Aid Foundation
Japan

 Human Rights Now

Kazakhstan

 KIBHR – Kazakhstan International Bureau for Human Rights and Rule of Law 
 KK – Dignity-Kadyr-kassiyet
 ILI – International Legal Initiative Public Foundation

Kyrgyzstan

 Bir Duino

Malaysia
 ERA Consumers – Education and Research Association for Consumers
 SUARAM – Suara Rakyat Malaysia
 KOMAS – Pusat Komunikasi Masyarakat
Maldives
 MDN – Maldivian Democracy Network
Mongolia
 CHRD – Center for Human Rights and Development
 GI – Globe International
 NCAV – National Center Against Violence 
 PSR –  Psychological Responsiveness NGO
 MONFEMNET National Network r
Nepal
 INSEC –  Informal Sector Service Centre
 CSRC –  Community Self Reliance Centre
 KIRDARC –  Karnali Integrated Rural Development and Research Centre 
 WOREC –  Women's Rehabilitation Centre
 YoAC – Youth Action Nepal
 National Alliance for Human rights and Social Justice
 JCYCN –  Jagriti Child and Youth Concern Nepal 
New Zealand

 Human Rights Measurement Initiative

Pakistan
 B4A – Bytes for All (ICTs for development, democracy and social justice)
 NCJP – National Commission for Justice and Peace
 PODA – Potahar Organization for Development Advocacy
 SPARC – Society for the Protection of the Rights of the Child
 AWAZCDS – AWAZ Foundation Pakistan: Centre for Development Services
 AWAM – Association of Women for Awareness & Motivation
 The Awakening - A Society for Social & Cultural Development
 Defence of Human Rights
Philippines
 PAHRA – Philippine Alliance of Human Rights Advocates
 TFDP – Task Force Detainees of the Philippines
 TK – Tanggol-Kalikasan – Public Interest Environmental Law Office
 BALAOD Mindanaw – Balay Alternative Legal Advocates for Development in Mindanaw 
 DAKILA – Philippine Collective for Modern Heroism 
 KARAPATAN – Karapatan Alliance Philippines
 LILAK – Purple Action for Indigenous Women's Rights
Singapore
 Think Centre

South Korea
 KHIS – Korean House for International Solidarity
 PSPD – People's Solidarity for Participatory Democracy
Sri Lanka
 INFORM – Human Rights Documentation Centre
 LST – Law and Society Trust
 R2L – Rights to Life Human Rights Centre
 RN – Rights Now Collective for Democracy
Taiwan
 TAHR – Taiwan Association for Human Rights
 CW – Covenants Watch
Thailand
 PEF – People's Empowerment Foundation
 AWARD – Association for Human Rights and Women's Rights in Development
 CRC – Community Resource Centre
Timor Leste
 HAK Association – Perkumpulan Hukum, Hak Asasi dan Keadilan (Law, Basic Rights, and Justice Foundation)
 JSMP – Judicial System Monitoring Programme
Vietnam
 VNWHR – Vietnamese Women for Human Rights

See also 
 Human rights in Asia
 Human security
 List of human rights organisations

References

External links 
 

Human rights organizations based in the Philippines